Samohodnaya Ustanovka (SU; , lit. "Self-propelled installation") may refer to any of these Soviet casemate self-propelled guns:

 SU-5-1, an SPG based on the T-26 tank. 
 SU-8, experimental SPG on the chassis of the T-28 tank.
 SU-14, a prototype heavy self-propelled gun built on a T-35 chassis.
 SU-18, a self-propelled gun based on the T-18 tank. 
 SU-26, a self-propelled gun of an open-top design over a T-26 light tank chassis.
 SU-57, the Soviet designation for lend-leased T48 Gun Motor Carriages.
 SU-76, a self-propelled gun used during and after World War II based to a modified T-70 chassis.
 SU-85A, a SU-76 with an 85mm D-5S-85A gun.
 SU-85, a self-propelled gun used during World War II, based on the chassis of the T-34 medium tank.
 SU-100, a tank destroyer armed with a powerful 100 mm anti-tank gun in a casemate superstructure over the chassis of the T-34 tank.
 SU-100P, a experimental tank destroyer. 
 SU-100Y, a prototype tank destroyer armed with a 130 mm naval gun mounted on the chassis of a T-100 tank.
 SU-101 (Uralmash), experimental tank destroyer.
 SU-122, a SPG based on T-34 chassis armed with a 122mm M-30S howitzer.
 SU-122P, an SU-100 with a 122mm D-2-5S gun.
 SU-122-44, a Cold War-era tank destroyer over the T-44 chassis.
 SU-122-54, a Cold War-era tank destroyer over the T-54 chassis.
 SU-152, a self-propelled heavy howitzer used during World War II over the KV-1S heavy tank chassis.
 SU-152G, a experimental self-propelled howitzer based on the chassis of the SU-100P.
 SU-152P, a experimental SPG.
 ISU-122, a tank destroyer based on the IS-2 chassis equipped with an A-19 122mm gun.
 ISU-130, a tank destroyer based on the IS-2 chassis armed with an 130mm S-26 gun.
 ISU-152, another heavy howitzer of World War II over the IS-2 heavy tank chassis.
 Object 704, a modernized ISU-152 made in 1945.
 ISU-152-10, another name for Object 268, an experimental self-propelled heavy howitzer over the T-10 heavy tank chassis
 Object 120 "SU-152 Taran", a prototype tank destroyer armed with a 152mm M69 cannon.
 ASU-57, a small, lightly constructed airborne assault gun of the Cold War Era
 ASU-76, an experimental airborne assault gun
 ASU-85, a Soviet-designed airborne self-propelled gun of the Cold War Era over the PT-76 light tank chassis.
Zenitnaya Samokhodnaya Ustanovka (Russian: зенитная самоходная установка - ЗСУ, lit. Zenithal (anti-aircraft) self-propelled installation), a subcategory of SU, May refer to any of these SPAAWs:

 ZSU-23-4 Shilka, a radar-guided self-propelled anti-aircraft weapon over the GM chassis.
 ZSU-37, a World War II-era SPAAG on a modified SU-76 chassis.
 ZSU-37-2 Yenisei, a self-propelled anti-aircraft weapon developed in tandem with the Shilka
 ZSU-57-2, a self-propelled anti-aircraft weapon, and later light tank, over the T-54 medium tank chassis.

See also
 List of armoured fighting vehicles by country#Soviet Union

Self-propelled artillery of the Soviet Union